The Skylarks were an all-woman South African band of the 1950s, founded by Miriam Makeba. At one time they were the most popular black singing band in the country. They also recorded and played as The Sunbeams. They played a blend of South African music and jazz.

References

South African jazz musicians
Girl groups
South African pop music groups
South African women singers